Binda may refer to:

 Binda, New South Wales, village in New South Wales, Australia.
 Binda (titular see), an ancient Roman Catholic bishopric in present-day Turkey
 Bindaios, the town hosting the see
 Binda Group, a watch and jewelry company

People 

 Albino Binda (1904–1976), Italian racing cyclist
 Alfredo Binda (1902–1986), Italian cyclist of the 1920s and 1930s
  Marie Beatrice Binda, known as Mademoiselle Beatrice (1839–1878), Italian-born actress in England

See also
 Trofeo Alfredo Binda-Comune di Cittiglio, a women's professional road bicycle racing event